The Place to Be is an album by saxophonist Junior Cook recorded in 1988 and released on the SteepleChase label.

Track listing 
 "Cedar's Blues" (Cedar Walton) – 5:03
 "I Should Have Known" (Mickey Tucker) – 11:33
 "Are You Real" (Benny Golson) – 5:36
 "She Rote" (Charlie Parker) – 4:32 Bonus track on CD release
 "Gnid" (Tadd Dameron) – 9:03 Bonus track on CD release
 "This Is the Place to Be" (Tucker) – 7:50
 "Over the Rainbow" (Harold Arlen, Yip Harburg) – 8:54
 "Cup Bearer" (Tom McIntosh) – 8:05

Personnel 
Junior Cook – tenor saxophone
Mickey Tucker – piano
Wayne Dockery – bass
Leroy Williams – drums

References 

Junior Cook albums
1989 albums
SteepleChase Records albums